Attorney General Poindexter may refer to:

George Poindexter (1779–1853), Territorial Attorney General of Mississippi
Joseph Poindexter (1869–1951), Attorney General of Montana